Matebeng is a town in southeast Lesotho, situated close to the Senqu River. It lies at the western approach to the Matebeng Pass, which links it with the town of Mavuka.

References
Fitzpatrick, M., Blond, B., Pitcher, G., Richmond, S., and Warren, M. (2004) South Africa, Lesotho and Swaziland. Footscray, VIC: Lonely Planet.

Populated places in Lesotho